TVS is the first regional Silesia commercial DVB-T free-to-air television station with information and entertainment profile. The TVS television channel is directed mainly to the inhabitants of the Silesian Voivodeship, covering the historical lands of Upper Silesia and Lesser Poland (including Dąbrowa and Kraków basins). The company and its television studios are headquartered at Grunwaldzki Square in the Silesian Metropolis of Katowice. TVS was created as a competitor to the public service broadcaster TVP3 Katowice. TVS started broadcasting on March, 2008 at 10:00 am in 16:9 format.

History
At the end of 2006, an application was submitted to the National Broadcasting Council for a channel license.

On March 19, 2008, the TVS regional channel launched a test broadcast.

On March 27, 2008, the TVS internet portal was launched. On the tvs.pl website, information from the Silesian Voivodeship is published along with photos and video materials, there are also articles from various areas of life.

March 29, 2008 after 10. TVS viewers were welcomed by Marek Czyż, accompanied by the regional Song and Dance Ensemble "Śląsk". Arkadiusz Hołda, president of TV Silesia, was greeted with bread and salt. During the first hours, the channel's journalists talked to invited guests, incl. Artur Rojek, Kamil Durczok, Tadeusz Sławek and Krystyna Bochenek.

April 14, 2008 at At 9.00 pm, the news magazine "Silesia news" debuted on the air.

On May 5, 2008, TV Silesia decided to extend the broadcasting time of the program and to increase the number of news and current affairs programs.

On July 5, 2008 at At 7.00, "Radio Silesia na wizji" debuted, the first program of this type in Poland.

From December 4, 2008, the station is available to the Polish community in the US and Canada. Broadcasting of the program began around the clock.

During Christmas in 2008, the Silesian Television showed its first film items. On December 31, 2008, the station organized the first New Year's Eve party in Katowice.

At the sart of 2009, it was decided to broadcast the films on a regular basis. In March 2009, teletext was introduced. On March 29, 2009, TVS prepared the "TVS Open Day" with performances by stars of the Silesian stage.

In October, Marek Czyż becomes the new program director of the station. He replaces Sławomir Zieliński, who left the station two months earlier.

Transmission

Profile

Since the beginning of the station's existence, its programs informed mainly about events from the Silesia region. TVS also broadcasts programs promoting Silesia, its culture, history, traditions and regional Schlager music—where TVS together with Radio Silesia 96.2 FM actively engages in the promotional process of regional music artists on the Silesian music stage. The main programme subjects related to the Silesia region and the Silesian Voivodship dominate. In addition to information, journalistic and entertainment programmes, TVS also airs iconic Polish and foreign drama programmes such as Magnum, P.I., Murder, She Wrote, Miami Vice and Kojak with soundtrack voice-over translation. Since 2011, a gradual process of expanding the nature of the television station and changing the format to include nationwide events whilst maintaining a regional character of information has begun. The station broadcasts 24 hours a day.

References

External links 
 Official site of TVS channel

Television channels in Poland
Television channels and stations established in 2008
Mass media in Katowice